AM4 or AM-4 may refer to:

 Socket AM4, a socket for AMD processors utilizing the Zen microarchitecture
 Amusement Vision, video game developer formerly known as Sega-AM4
 USS Swallow (AM-4), a U.S. Navy minesweeper
 Ekspress-AM4, a Russian satellite that never reached its intended orbit
 Another name for AAA battery
 Another name for the synthetic cannabinoid AM-2201
 British Rail Class 304 train, originally known as class AM4